Craig Sweeny is an American television producer and screenwriter.

Sweeny is known for his writing on and producing the science fiction television series The 4400 and for creating and writing the series Limitless. He has also written for television series such as Elementary, Medium, Dr. Vegas and Star Trek: Discovery. His production company is Action This Day! 

More recently, he struck a new overall deal with CBS Studios.

Craig Sweeny trains regularly in Brazilian jiu-jitsu.

References

External links 
 

Living people
American male screenwriters
American television producers
Year of birth missing (living people)
Showrunners
American television writers
American male television writers